Deontae Skinner (born December 18, 1990) is a former American football linebacker. He played college football at Mississippi State and attended Noxubee County High School in Macon, Mississippi. He has played for the New England Patriots, Philadelphia Eagles, and New York Giants.

Early years
Skinner played high school football at Noxubee County High School. He was named First-team All-State for his accomplishments during his senior year, recording 134 tackles, 28 tackles for loss, 11 of which were sacks, and two forced fumbles. Skinner recorded 122 tackles and five sacks his junior year.

College career
Skinner played football for the Mississippi State Bulldogs from 2010 to 2013. He was redshirted for the 2009 season.

Professional career

New England Patriots
Skinner was signed by the New England Patriots on May 12, 2014, after going undrafted in the 2014 NFL Draft. He was released by the Patriots on August 26, 2014. He was signed to the team's practice squad on September 1, 2014. Skinner was promoted to the active roster on September 13, 2014, and was part of the team that won Super Bowl XLIX over the Seattle Seahawks. He made his NFL debut on September 14, 2014, against the Minnesota Vikings, recording two tackles. Skinner was released by the Patriots on October 29, 2014, and re-signed to the team's practice squad on October 31. He was released by the Patriots on November 26 and re-signed to the team's practice squad on December 3, 2014. He was released by the Patriots on May 5, 2015.

Philadelphia Eagles
Skinner signed with the Philadelphia Eagles on August 14, 2015. He was released by the Eagles on September 5 and signed to the team's practice squad on September 6, 2015. On August 22, 2016, Skinner was released by the Eagles.

New York Giants
On September 13, 2016, Skinner was signed to the New York Giants' practice squad. He was released on September 17, 2016, and re-signed to the practice squad on September 19. He was promoted to the active roster on October 11, 2016. He was released again on November 19, 2016. He was re-signed to the active roster on December 3, 2016.

On September 2, 2017, Skinner was waived by the Giants. He was re-signed by the Giants on September 28, 2017. He was released again on October 4, 2017.

Oakland Raiders
On October 10, 2017, Skinner was signed to the Oakland Raiders' practice squad.

New York Giants (second stint)
On November 7, 2017, Skinner was signed by the Giants off the Raiders' practice squad. He was placed on injured reserve on November 27, 2017. He was waived by the Giants on February 22, 2018.

Tennessee Titans
On August 21, 2018, Skinner was signed by the Tennessee Titans. He was waived on August 28, 2018.

References

External links
College stats

Living people
1990 births
American football linebackers
African-American players of American football
Mississippi State Bulldogs football players
New England Patriots players
Oakland Raiders players
Philadelphia Eagles players
New York Giants players
People from Macon, Mississippi
Players of American football from Mississippi
Tennessee Titans players
Birmingham Iron players
21st-century African-American sportspeople